Warrick County is a county located in the U.S. state of Indiana. As of 2020, the population was 63,898. The county seat is Boonville. It was organized in 1813 and was named for Captain Jacob Warrick, an Indiana militia company commander killed in the Battle of Tippecanoe in 1811. It is one of the ten fastest-growing counties in Indiana.

Warrick County is the eastern part of the Evansville, IN–KY Metropolitan Statistical Area.

History
Warrick County was formed by statute, March 9, 1813, effective April 30, 1813. Knox County was affected by this formation and Warrick and Gibson Counties were both created out of this area of Knox County between the White River and the Ohio River. The boundaries of this area began at the mouth of the Wabash River; then up the Wabash River with the meanders thereof to the mouth of the White River; then up the White River with the meanders thereof to the Forks of the White River; then up White River East Fork to where the line between Sections 20 and 29, Township 1 North, Range 4 West, strikes the same; then with that line to the then Gibson County line; then with that line dividing Gibson and Knox Counties to the Ohio River; then down the Ohio River, to the place of beginning.
The same was divided into two separate and distinct counties, by a line beginning on the Wabash River, known as Rector's Base Line (was surveyed by William Rector on the line between Townships 4 South and 5 South, from New Harmony, Posey County, and Alton, Crawford County, Indiana), and with that line east until it intersects the then Gibson County line and that tract of land falling within the southern division thereof was Warrick County. However, because Gibson County organized a month earlier on April 1, this entire territory fell under Gibson County's jurisdiction. Within Warrick County's original jurisdiction included large portions but not entire portions of Crawford, Perry, Posey, Vanderburgh, and roughly 2/3s of Warrick County's current jurisdiction. Evansville was the original county seat, followed by Yankeetown, Newburgh, and finally Boonville, the current seat.

Geography

Adjacent Counties
 Pike County - north (ET)
 Dubois County - northeast (ET)
 Spencer County - east
 Daviess County, Kentucky - southeast
 Henderson County, Kentucky - south & southwest
 Vanderburgh County - west
 Gibson County - northwest

Cities and towns

 Boonville
 Chandler
 Elberfeld
 Lynnville
 Newburgh
 Tennyson

Unincorporated towns 

 Ash Iron Springs
 Baugh City
 Bullocktown
 Camp Brosend
 Center
 Dayville
 De Gonia Springs
 Dickeyville
 Eames
 Eby
 Fisherville
 Folsomville
 Graham Valley
 Greenbrier
 Heilman
 Hemenway
 Hillcrest Terrace
 Jarretts
 Jockey
 Loafers Station
 Millersburg
 New Hope
 Paradise
 Pelzer
 Red Bush
 Rolling Acres
 Rosebud
 Rustic Hills
 Saint John
 Scalesville
 Selvin
 Stanley
 Stevenson
 Turpin Hill
 Vanada
 Victoria
 Wheatonville
 Yankeetown

Townships

 Anderson
 Boon
 Campbell
 Greer
 Hart
 Lane
 Ohio
 Owen
 Pigeon
 Skelton

Major highways

Climate and weather 

Demographics

As of the 2010 United States Census, there were 59,689 people, 22,505 households, and 17,009 families residing in the county. The racial makeup of the county was 95.0% white, 1.6% Asian, 1.3% black or African American, 0.2% American Indian, 0.5% from other races, and 1.3% from two or more races. Those of Hispanic or Latino origin made up 1.6% of the population. In terms of ancestry, 35.3% were German, 15.4% were Irish, 13.4% were American, and 12.5% were English.

Of the 22,505 households, 36.4% had children under the age of 18 living with them, 62.7% were married couples living together, 9.2% had a female householder with no husband present, 24.4% were non-families, and 20.7% of all households were made up of individuals. The average household size was 2.62 and the average family size was 3.02. The median age was 39.7 years.

The median income for a household in the county was $47,697 and the median income for a family was $73,583. Males had a median income of $51,961 versus $32,885 for females. The per capita income for the county was $29,737. About 3.9% of families and 6.1% of the population were below the poverty line, including 6.4% of those under age 18 and 6.3% of those age 65 or over.

Government

The county government is a constitutional body, and is granted specific powers by the Constitution of Indiana, and by the Indiana Code.

County Council: The county council is the legislative branch of the county government and controls all the spending and revenue collection in the county. Four representatives are elected from county districts, and three are elected as "at-large" members. The council members serve four-year terms. They are responsible for setting salaries, the annual budget, and special spending. The council also has limited authority to impose local taxes, in the form of an income and property tax that is subject to state level approval, excise taxes, and service taxes.

Board of Commissioners: The executive body of the county is made of a board of commissioners. The commissioners are elected county-wide, in staggered terms, and each serves a four-year term. One of the commissioners, typically the most senior, serves as president. The commissioners are charged with executing the acts legislated by the council, collecting revenue, and managing the day-to-day functions of the county government.

Court: The county maintains a small claims court that can handle some civil cases. The judge on the court is elected to a term of four years and must be a member of the Indiana Bar Association. The judge is assisted by a constable who is also elected to a four-year term. In some cases, court decisions can be appealed to the state level circuit court.

County Officials: The county has several other elected offices, including sheriff, coroner, auditor, treasurer, recorder, surveyor, assessor, and circuit court clerk. Each of these elected officers serves a term of four years and oversees a different part of county government. Members elected to county government positions are required to declare party affiliations and to be residents of the county.

Education 
The county's school corporation is Warrick County School Corporation which consists of 16 schools (two high schools, one senior/junior high, three middle schools, ten elementary schools, and one alternative school). In the Fall of 2009, the corporation transitioned its stand-alone Junior High schools in the Boonville and Castle High School Districts from the Junior High system to the Middle School system, with the addition of one middle school (Castle South Middle School) in the Castle District. Castle Junior High was renamed Castle North Middle School. Warrick County's three middle schools are composed of grades six through eight.
 Warrick County School Corporation

Warrick County High Schools

See also
 National Register of Historic Places listings in Warrick County, Indiana

References

External links
 Warrick County government's website
 Warrick County Community Foundation website
 Boonville / Warrick County youth sports website

 
Indiana counties
1813 establishments in Indiana Territory
Populated places established in 1813
Indiana counties on the Ohio River
Evansville metropolitan area
Southwestern Indiana